UFC Fight Night: Shogun vs. Saint Preux (also known as UFC Fight Night 56) was a mixed martial arts event held at the Ginásio Municipal Tancredo Neves in Uberlândia, Brazil, on November 8, 2014.

Background
After previously holding events in Minas Gerais's largest city Belo Horizonte, the event was the first that the organization has hosted in Uberlândia.

A light heavyweight bout between Maurício Rua and Jimi Manuwa was expected to serve as event headliner. However, on October 29, it was announced that Manuwa had pulled out of the fight due to injury and Ovince Saint Preux replaced him in main event against Rua.

Rafael Cavalcante was expected to face Ovince Saint Preux at the event.  However, Cavalcante pulled out of the bout citing injury and was replaced by Francimar Barroso. Subsequently, this fight was cancelled when Saint Preux was chosen as an injury replacement in the event headliner.

Dhiego Lima was originally scheduled to face Pawel Pawlak at this event.  However, Pawlak was forced to pull out of the fight due to injury and was replaced by promotional newcomer Jorge de Oliveira.

A bout between Ian McCall and John Lineker was expected to be the co-main event.  However, just hours after both fighters successfully made weight, it was announced that McCall had to pull out of the fight due to a viral infection and the bout was pulled from the event entirely. The bout between Dhiego Lima and Jorge de Oliveira was moved to the main card.

Results

Bonus awards
The following fighters were awarded $50,000 bonuses:

Fight of the Night: Thomas Almeida vs. Tim Gorman
Performance of the Night: Ovince Saint Preux and Leandro Silva

See also
List of UFC events
2014 in UFC

References

UFC Fight Night
Mixed martial arts in Brazil
2014 in mixed martial arts
2014 in Brazilian sport